The Isabel Leidig Building is a historic commercial building in Carmel-by-the-Sea, California. It was built and designed in 1925, by master builder Michael J. Murphy as a restaurant. It is an example of a mix of Monterey colonial style with Spanish Colonial Revival. The structure is recognized as an important commercial building in the city's Downtown Conservation District Historic Property Survey, and was nominated and submitted to the California Register of Historical Resources on June 18, 2002. The building is occupied by Mulligan Public House pub and Gallery North.

History

The Isabel Leidig Building is a two-story commercial Monterey Colonial style building on Dolores Street between Ocean Avenue and 7th Avenue in Carmel-by-the-Sea, California. Michael J. Murphy designed and constructed the building in 1925. It was owned by Robert G. Leidig and Isabel Martin (see section below about Isabel Leidig).

The opening of the "Studio Restaurant" was in the new Leidig building that took place on June 5, 1925. Proprietor T. L. Edler held a special dinner with live music played by the Kelsey's orchestra. The restaurant had seven booths and space for twelve tables. Stairs lead upstairs to the restrooms and an office spaces.

The building is opposite the Mary Dummage Shop and Piccadilly Park, and on the same block as a group of shops along Dolores Street that include the El Paseo Building, Tuck Box, De Yoe Building, W. C. Farley Building, and the Percy Parkes Building. This group of buildings are some of the most architecturally significant commercial stores in Carmel.

The Isabel Leidig Building is a two-story rough troweled stucco building with a side gabled Spanish tiled roof stretched over a Monterey Style balcony on the upper story with two French doors, and an arched window on the north side. The balcony is supported by corbel wood brackets. On the ground floor, there is an awning over the front left-side rectangular show window, between an entry door that leads to the rear of the property, and an arched window on the right. An arched entry on the south side gives access to stairs that lead to the upstairs offices. The original cost, in 1925, to build the commercial building for the Leidig's was $9,200.

The building qualifies for inclusion in the city's Downtown Conservation District Historic Property Survey, and has been nominated and submitted to the California Register of Historical Resources on June 18, 2002. The property is significant under the California Register criterion 4, in the history of the local area, as a commercial architecture development in downtown Carmel, mixing Monterey colonial style with Spanish Colonial Revival. Even though the original building permit was lost, it is believed that certain details in architecture point to designs created by master builder Michael J. Murphy. These include the second story Monterey Style balcony, Spanish white stucco, and the recessed arched windows. This building is also part of a block of commercial buildings on Dolores Street, between Ocean Avenue and 7th Avenue, that demonstrate Carmel's historic commercial development in the 1920s.

This property has been the home of several businesses over the years. It was the site of T. L. Edler's Studio Restaurant starting in 1925, Intimate Intrigue in 1979, Village Artistry in 1989, Greek Tavema in 1991, and Mondo's Trattoria restaurant in 1993. Several additions and remodeling’s took place over the years. In 1979, an interior remodel was done by Historic Design Associates for $9.000. An upstairs remodel was done by architect William Egan and contracted with Tom Tolas in 1982 for $37,000. In 1989, an interior remodel was done by master craftsman William McFall Associates for $10,000. In 1997, a new roof was completed for $17,360.

Isabel Leidig
Isabel A. Martin (1884-1961) was born on February 12, 1884, in Carmel-by-the-Sea, California. She was the daughter of John Martin (1827-1893) and Elizabeth Hislop (1837-1916) who came to Monterey County in 1856 where they raised their children. John Martin and his brother Robert bought land around the Carmel River in 1859 from Lafayette F. Loveland. He built the Martin Ranch on  that went as far as the Carmel River to the homes along Carmel Point. The ranch became known as the Mission Ranch because it was so close to the Carmel Mission. They farmed potatoes and barley and had a milk dairy. 

Isabel married Robert George Leidig (1879-1970) on October 20, 1910, at the Mission Ranch. They had three children during their marriage, Martin, Theodore, and Jean.

In 1906, Robert Leidig and his brother Frederick, opened the Carmel-by-the-Sea's first Grocery Store on the north side of Ocean Avenue and Lincoln Street. He later was manager of Holman's Carmel hardware store that was located in the Carmel Development Company Building.

In the 1920s, Robert Leidig and his wife Isabel owned property on the east side of Dolores Stret. In 1925, Isabel was listed as the original owner of the Isabel Leidig Building. Robert and Isabel Leidig also built the large two-story Spanish Revival style, white stucco mixed-use Draper Leidig Building in 1929, on the east side of Dolores Street near Ocean Avenue.

Robert Leidig was one of the early founders of the Carmel Volunteer Fire Department in July 1915. He became chief of the department in January 1925. He served as the village fire marshal and chief for 53 years. He was fire chief at the opening of the new Carmel Fire Station in 1937. He later opened, with Thomas B. Reardon, a service station on the northeast corner of San Carolos Street and Sixth Avenue.

Robert and Isabel's daughter Jean, married Raymond Jesse Draper (1916-1981) of Pacific Grove, California, on October 16, 1938, in St. John's Chapel, Del Monte and Rev. Theodore Bell officated.

On October 10, 1960, Isabel and Robert Leidig celebrated their 50th golden wedding anniversary at a dinner party at the Mission Ranch where they were married 50 years ago. There was also a reception in the Garden Room of the La Playa Hotel given to them by their daughter Jean, and her husband Raymond Draper.

Isabel Leidig died of a heart attack in her home at Ocean Avenue and Dolores Street on September 11, 1961, in California at the age of 77. Funeral services were in the Paul Funeral Chapel. Rev. David Hill, rector of All Saints' Episcopal Church, officiated. She was buried in the family plot in the City of Monterey Cemetery, Cementerio El Encinal.

On December 18, 1924, Robert Leidig died in a convalescent home at age 91. Private services were at the Little Chapel-by-the-Sea in Pacific Grove. Rev. David Hill, rector of All Saints' Episcopal Church in Carmel, officiated the services. Interment was at the City of Monterey Cemetery, Cementerio El Encinal.

See also
List of Historic Buildings in Carmel-by-the-Sea

References

External links

 Downtown Conservation District Historic Property Survey

1925 establishments in California
Carmel-by-the-Sea, California
Buildings and structures in Monterey County, California
Spanish Colonial Revival architecture in California